Lucrezia Borgia (1480–1519) was an Italian aristocrat.

Lucrezia Borgia may also refer to:

 Lucrezia Borgia (play), an 1833 play written by Victor Hugo
 Lucrezia Borgia (opera), an 1833 opera composed by Gaetano Donizetti
 Lucrezia Borgia (1912 film), an Italian film directed by Gerolamo Lo Savio
 Lucrezia Borgia (1919 film), an Italian silent film directed by Augusto Genina
 Lucrezia Borgia (1922 film), a German film directed by Richard Oswald
 Lucrezia Borgia (1935 film), a French film directed by Abel Gance
 Lucrezia Borgia (1940 film), an Italian film directed by Hans Hinrich
 Lucrezia Borgia (1947 film), an Argentine film directed by Luis Bayón Herrera  
 Lucrèce Borgia, a 1953 French-Italian film directed by Christian-Jaque 
Lucretia Borgia, the nickname Buffalo Bill gave to his Springfield Model 1866 rifle

See also